Gerald A. Everling (born c. 1943) is a former American football player and coach and collegiate wrestler and coach. He was the head football coach at Union College in Schenectady, New York from 1971 to 1974. Everling played college football at Syracuse University and spent one season with the Mohawk Valley Falcons of the Atlantic Coast Football League (ACFL).

References

1943 births
Living people
American football offensive guards
Atlantic Coast Football League players
Syracuse Orange football players
Syracuse Orangemen wrestlers
Union Dutchmen football coaches
College wrestling coaches in the United States
High school football coaches in New York (state)